is a role-playing video game developed by Glodia that was released for multiple platforms in Japan. It was released for NEC Corporation's PC-8801 and PC-9801 home computers on December 22, 1989, followed by conversions for the X68000 (released on December 6, 1990), MSX2 (released on December 26 of the same year) and FM Towns (released on May 28, 1992). Developer Alfa System later produced console versions of the game for the PC Engine in Super CD-ROM² format (released on January 28, 1994) and the Super Famicom (released on July 28, 1995). The game features characters and locations based on Zoroastrian mythology.

Gameplay

The game utilises a top-down overhead perspective, where players move the controllable character in two dimensions. As players move around in a world map, they may encounter battles, which are turn-based with a time point system: both movements and attacks sap a bar on the top of the screen, and the character's turn ends when the bar is depleted. Experience points, which are used to level up playable characters, are collected for defeating enemies.

Stronger attacks for the main protagonist, Atorushan, are made available through collecting key items called the Emerald Graces. These transform him into a dragon to unleash a powerful attack, at the cost of reducing his HP when used.

Plot
A long time ago, dragons and humans lived in peace in the land of Ishbahn. Lord Tiridates, believing the existence of dragons among humans defiles Ishbahn, places a curse that kills dragons in the area. Some of the dragons (now collectively called the Dragon Tribe) manage to escape and find refuge in Draguria, where a dimensional rift prevents humans from crossing it.

At the start of the game, a ship wrecks on the coast of Draguria. The protagonist, a Dragon Tribe youth named Atorushan seeks the friendship of the sole survivor, a human girl named Tamryn by the White Dragon, leader of the tribe. The girl is nurtured by the dragons of the land, but 12 years later she leaves as she wants to find happiness with those of her own kind. Atorushan breaks off his left horn and gives it to her as a means of summoning him should she need assistance.

Three years after this incident, Atorushan is called by the White Dragon as the aforementioned horn was blown. Granting him a silver scale to keep him from perishing under the curse of Ishbahn, the White Dragon sends him there to tend to Tamryn.

Upon arriving, Atorushan learns that the entirety of Ishbahn is under attack by evil armies controlled by Tiridates. To stop him and remove the land's curse, he needs to find the five Emerald Graces, dragon-based treasures scattered around the land, and resurrect the Emerald Dragon, the greatest of all dragons destined to bring about a miracle.

Reception
Emerald Dragon maintains a score of 3.62/5 from 56 votes on the gamefaqs website as of April 2020. Youtubers who have reviewed the game have given it a positive rating , the youtuber SNES drunk has said of the game "I wouldn't think of Emerald Dragon as among the ranks of the best role playing games the SNES has to offer but it's certainly a worthwhile play through if you want to scratch that JRPG itch 5:00-5:08. The youtuber Avalanche Reviews  commented on the English fan translation of the super nintendo version "Aside from the novelty of being a recently translated Japanese RPG Emerald Dragon is also an interesting stab at changing the traditional  RPG format in some very small but very effective ways. If you've grown tired of the slim pickings we westerners have been awarded in the RPG department Emerald Dragon may be exactly what you're looking for, It's not an amazing example of what the genre can accomplish but it is a fun, different well written change of pace and ultimately well worth your time 6:30-6:56".

Legacy
Akihiro Kimura successfully crowdfunded a sequel audio series titled Elemental Dragoon in 2015.  It is based on ideas that were proposed for a sequel to Emerald Dragon back in the 1990s but never got off the ground due to apparent copyright issues (though Kimura and others made several independent dōjinshi and novels continuing the story over the years).  The series was designed to get around copyright issues (by focusing on new characters and slightly changing names such as the title, though the original characters appear at the end) and to hopefully allow Kimura to generate interest for a true sequel to Emerald Dragon and regain the copyright.

References

1989 video games
Video games about dragons
MediaWorks games
NEC PC-8801 games
NEC PC-9801 games
MSX2 games
X68000 games
FM Towns games
TurboGrafx-CD games
Super Nintendo Entertainment System games
Japan-exclusive video games
Video games developed in Japan
Video games scored by Yasuhiko Fukuda
Role-playing video games